The Kavli Institute for Cosmology, Cambridge (KICC) is a research establishment set up through collaboration of the University of Cambridge and the Kavli Foundation. It is operated by two of the University's astronomy groups: the Institute of Astronomy (IoA) and the Cavendish Astrophysics Group.

Background
In August 2006 an agreement was reached between the University of Cambridge and the Kavli Foundation for the establishment of an Institute for cosmology. The Kavli Foundation will support several 5-year senior research fellowships in perpetuity, and the University committed to provide a building to house the Institute. Operation began in October 2008 with the appointment of the first Kavli Institute Fellows. The building was completed in July 2009, and was officially opened 18 November 2009 by Prince Philip as Chancellor of the University in a ceremony with Fred Kavli.

The director of the Institute is Roberto Maiolino; the deputy director is Anthony Challinor. The first director was George Efstathiou of the IoA.

Projects
KICC researchers are involved in the following projects:

 Atacama Large Millimeter Array
 Dark Energy Survey
 Dark Energy Spectroscopic Instrument
 Extremely Large Telescope
 Illustris project
 James Webb Space Telescope
 KLEVER (Kmos LEnsed Velocity and Emission line Review)
 Large Synoptic Survey Telescope
 MaNGA sky survey
 MOONS galaxy survey
 Planck cosmological survey
 Square Kilometre Array
 Simons Observatory

Kavli Building

The Kavli Building is located adjacent to the Hoyle Building, the main building of the IoA. The two are connected via a raised walkway. The building was designed to encourage the occupants to interact with one another as well as with the occupants of the Hoyle building. It is intended to be similar in architectural style to the Hoyle Building, but to be sufficiently distinctive so as to retain an independent identity. The architects were Annand and Mustoe. The design includes use of ground source heat pumps and a heat exchanger serving under-floor heating to meet City Council requirements that at least 10% of the building's energy is generated on-site.

References

External links
 The Kavli Institute for Cosmology at Cambridge website
 The Institute of Astronomy website
 The Cavendish Astrophysics Group website

Astronomy institutes and departments
Research institutes in the United Kingdom
Astronomy in the United Kingdom
Kavli Institutes